Alum Creek is an unincorporated community in Bastrop County, Texas, United States. According to the Handbook of Texas, the community had a population of 70 in 2000. It is located within the Greater Austin metropolitan area.

History 
Alum Creek was founded in 1829, one of the oldest communities in the county. Members of the Cottle, Highsmith, Craft, Parker, Grimes, Ridgeway, and White families (from Stephen F. Austin's lower colonies) built a fort for protection against Native Americans near the mouth of the community's namesake creek. With the families locating cabins and farms nearby, the town expanded enough to have the land deeded for a campground and meetinghouse in 1846. James Craft previously owned the latter. A post office was established at Alum Creek in 1851 and remained in operation until 1898. By 1853, a local Methodist Episcopal church had been formed. Alum Creek's population of 200 in 1884 supported three mills, two general stores, a blacksmith, and a saloon. This boom ended abruptly and by 1896, the population dipped to 40. The community failed to maintain enough of a population to be included in twentieth-century population estimates and census counts. The community had a community club in the 1930s and had only a few scattered homes and country antique shops by the mid-1980s. At the 2000 census, the population of Alum Creek was seventy.

Today, Alum Creek sustains several businesses, including A Place For Your Stuff a portable building manufacturer, and an unspecified store called Clutterbugs.

Geography

Education
A private school was established in the community in 1835 and remained operational until 1937. Today, the community is served by the Smithville Independent School District.

References

Unincorporated communities in Bastrop County, Texas
Unincorporated communities in Texas